Basarab Nică Panduru (born 11 July 1970) is a Romanian retired footballer and currently television pundit for Telekom Sport.

Playing career
Born in Mârzănești, Romania, Panduru started his professional career with CSM Reşiţa where he played between 1987 and 1990, before being signed by Steaua București at the beginning of 1991. Panduru's first game with Steaua was in the Romanian Cup, when the Steaua's officials did not take into consideration that just prior leaving CSM Reşiţa, Panduru was set to miss the next game due to yellow cards, therefore Steaua București lost that game after a federal decision.

As soon as he joined Steaua București he became an important part of the team. In 1995, however he left Romania to play for S.L. Benfica. The life in the capital of Portugal was not that easy, and he was loaned to Neuchâtel Xamax for half a season, before re-joining S.L. Benfica at the start of the 1996–97 season.

In 1998, he was bought by S.L. Benfica's rivals from FC Porto but failed to make an impact. During the summer of 1999, Panduru was close to sign a contract with Brazilian club Internacional Porto Alegre however, the transfer did not materialize. Then Panduru signed for SC Salgueiros on loan from Porto, his third team in Portugal but after only half-a-season and long-term injuries Panduru decided to retire and become coach.

International career
During his career Panduru earned 22 caps for Romania, scoring one goal, and was in the squad for the 1994 World Cup.

International stats

International goals

Managerial career
Panduru's first coaching agreement was the one with Poli AEK Timișoara, signed in 2002. At Timișoara he met his former teammate from Steaua București, Anton Doboş, now the team's co-owner. The couple worked well together for a while, but in 2004 Panduru basically sacked himself when he made a bad remark, by saying: "The defenders are not footballers, they are only the ones who help the footballers". What Panduru did not take into consideration was the fact that Anton Doboş, his boss, played as a defender.

He signed a new contract, this time with Oţelul Galaţi for the second half of the 2004–05 season without a league game, he left the team to sign with FC Vaslui in the summer of 2005, from where he was sacked after only few games. He was then the coach of FC Farul Constanţa before being sacked by the team owner after poor results.

At the end of October 2007 he signed on to manage second league team FC Progresul București.

In September 2009, Panduru was announced the new Director of Football of Steaua București, but on 14 May 2010, he resigned from this position, after a mutual agreement with the club's owner George Becali.

Honours

Club
Steaua București
 Divizia A: 1992–93, 1993–94, 1994–95
 Cupa României: 1991–92
 Supercupa României: 1994

FC Porto
 Primeira Divisão: 1998–99
 Supertaça Cândido de Oliveira: 1999

References

External links
 
 
 

1970 births
Living people
Romanian footballers
Romania international footballers
1994 FIFA World Cup players
FC Steaua București players
Neuchâtel Xamax FCS players
S.C. Salgueiros players
S.L. Benfica footballers
FC Porto players
FC Porto B players
Association football midfielders
FCV Farul Constanța managers
People from Teleorman County
Expatriate footballers in Portugal
Expatriate footballers in Switzerland
Romanian football managers
FC Politehnica Timișoara managers
FC Vaslui managers
FC Progresul București managers
Romanian expatriate footballers
Romanian expatriate sportspeople in Portugal
Primeira Liga players
Liga I players
Swiss Super League players